Cayetana de Alba may refer to:
María del Pilar Teresa Cayetana de Silva, 13th Duchess of Alba
María del Rosario Cayetana Fitz-James Stuart, 18th Duchess of Alba